Bible translations into Eskimo–Aleut languages include:

Inuit

Aleut
Matthew in Aleut language was translated by Russian Orthodox St. Innocent Veniaminov & St. Jacob Netsvetov. This was published first in 1840, and later 1896. Mark, Luke, and John were translated into Atkan Aleut in 1861 by Fr. Laurence Salamatov. They were not published. Fr. Innocent Shayashnikov translated Matthew, Mark, Luke, John, and Acts into Eastern Aleut in 1872. They were published between 1902 and 1903. More recently, the first few verses of Genesis 11 (recounting the tower of Babel) have been translated into modern Aleut for Omniglot.

Sugpiaq/Alutiiq 

The translation of Gospel of Matthew into Alutiiq by Ilya Tyzhnov (Elias Tishnoff) of the Russian Orthodox Alaska mission, was published in St. Petersburg, in 1848. More recently John 14 was translated into Sugpiaq, an audio recording of which was published online by Global Recordings Network.
 Digitally Typeset Edition (pdf)

Yupik

Central Siberian Yupik language
The New Testament in the Central Siberian Yupik language has been translated and is almost ready for publication. It is largely the work of David and Mitzi Shinen. When ready it will be published both in both Latin and Cyrillic scripts, so that it is accessible to Yupik living on St. Lawrence Island, as well as in Siberia. There translation of Mark was published previously in 1974, and Philippi in 1989. In 2006 a test edition of fifteen New Testament books (Matthew to Jude) was published.

Central Alaskan Yup'ik language
Three Russian Orthodox liturgical readings, St. Mark 1:9-11, St. Matthew 4:23-5:13, St. Mark 16:1-8, were translated into Central Alaskan Yup'ik language by John Orlov, of the Russian Orthodox Church in 1887. Moravian Missionary John Hinz translated Mark into a Yupik language, this being published in Germany in 1915. The four gospels and selections from the Psalms and New Testament was published as Kanegriarat Ashilret by the American Bible Society in 1929. The New Testament was then translated into a Yupik language by John Hinz and people from the Alaska Moravian Church. This was published by the American Bible Society in 1956. A particularly interesting change was a switch from using the standard Yupik Yesus(Modern Spelling: Yiissus) (used in previous editions and in Jacobson's dictionary) to the anglicized Jesus. Yupik orthography and spelling was not yet standardized. 

The complete Old Testament has since then been translated. It was published together with an updated edition of the New Testament by in 2015 the American Bible Society as "Tanqilriit Igat".

External links
Online Yup'ik Bible

References

Eskimo-Aleut
Eskaleut languages